Liane Carroll (born 9 February 1964, London) is an English vocalist, pianist and keyboardist.

Jazz critic Dave Gelly of The Observer has described her as "one of the most stylistically flexible pianists around, with a marvellous, slightly husky singing voice". According to John Fordham of The Guardian, she is "a powerful, soul-inflected performer with an Ella Fitzgerald-like improv athleticism and an emotional frankness on ballads". Peter Quinn of Jazzwise says: "Liane Carroll has that rare ability to meld effortless, often transcendent vocal and piano technique, with heart stopping emotion and soul bearing power." Nick Hasted of The Independent says that she is "still frustratingly little-known" but calls her "one of Britain's most emotionally visceral and accomplished singers".

Her five albums since 2009 have each received four-starred reviews in The Guardian or The Observer.

Early life
Carroll's parents were semi-professional singers who, she says, met and sang at the Country Club in Eastbourne. She grew up in a musical household in Hastings and in south London. She started learning the piano at the age of three, began composing at the age of eight, and has been a professional singer, pianist and composer since she was 15.

Professional career
In 1998 Carroll joined Trevor Watts' Moiré Music band and toured overseas with them. She became a respected session musician and also worked in bands under Dave Holdsworth, Gerry Rafferty, Jerry Donohue and Long John Baldry.

She formed her own trio and recorded for Jazz Art, Bridge, and Ronnie Scott's Jazz House.

From 1996 to 2002, Carroll worked with singer-songwriter-guitarist Peter Kirtley, with whom she composed many songs. They appeared together on a charity single for Brazilian street children, on which Carroll's backing singer was Paul McCartney.

From 1996 onwards Carroll started working with Hospital Records. In 2003 she toured internationally with a band formed by Hospital Records' owner Tony Colman, playing at the Brazilian Electro Dance Music Festival in Brasilia. In the early 2000s she began recording for the Splash Point label, releasing a series of recordings that embraced jazz, R&B and the singer-songwriter tradition. From 2005 onwards, she decided to focus on her jazz work.

Liane Carroll has worked with many artists ranging from Sir Paul McCartney and Gerry Rafferty to Ladysmith Black Mambazo. She has also performed as lead vocalist and Wurlitzer keyboardist for the drum and bass band London Elektricity. She is a regular performer at Ronnie Scott's Jazz Club and the 606 Club in London, and has made several albums. In addition to performing, Carroll also teaches at jazz summer schools in the UK and Europe and also conducts workshops.

Broadcasting
In 2013 Liane Carroll was a guest on Alex Horne's BBC Radio 4 comedy show Alex Horne Presents the Horne Section.

Awards and recognition
In 2005 Liane Carroll won two awards in the BBC Jazz Awards: Best Vocalist and Best of Jazz. In 2006 she won the Marston Pedigree Jazz Award for best vocalist. On 13 May 2008, Andy Burnham MP, then Secretary of State for Culture, Media and Sport, presented her with the 2008 award for Jazz Musician of the Year in the Parliamentary Jazz Awards. Her album Up and Down won in the Jazz Album of the Year category at the Parliamentary Jazz Awards in May 2012. In 2016 she won a Gold award from the British Academy of Songwriters, Composers and Authors (BASCA).

Personal life
Liane Carroll lives in Hastings with her husband Roger Carey, bassist in the Liane Carroll Trio; they married in 1990. She has a daughter, Abby and grandchildren from her first marriage.

Discography

Dave Holdsworth-Liane Carroll Quartet

Liane Carroll

London Elektricity

PTH Projects featuring Liane Carroll

Chris Garrick and John Etheridge with Liane Carroll

Compilation albums

Notes

References

External links
Official website

 
1964 births
Living people
20th-century British composers
20th-century British pianists
20th-century English women singers
20th-century English singers
20th-century women composers
21st-century British composers
21st-century British pianists
21st-century English women singers
21st-century English singers
21st-century women composers
British women composers
British women jazz singers
British jazz keyboardists
English women singer-songwriters
English jazz composers
English jazz pianists
English jazz singers
English keyboardists
Women jazz composers
Musicians from Hastings
Women jazz pianists
Women keyboardists
20th-century jazz composers
21st-century jazz composers
20th-century women pianists
21st-century women pianists